Eckville is a town in central Alberta, Canada. It is west of Red Deer on Highway 766 just north of Highway 11.

History 
Eckville gets its name from A. E. T. Eckford, a pioneer citizen.  Eckville relocated to its current location in 1912, after the Canadian Northern Railway completed its local line. The current location on the Canadian Northern Railway was briefly known as Kootuk, but the name Eckville prevailed.  Eckville was incorporated as a village in 1921 and became a town in 1966.

Geography

Climate 
Eckville experiences a humid continental climate (Köppen climate classification Dfb) which borders on a subarctic climate (Dfc).

Demographics 

In the 2016 Census of Population conducted by Statistics Canada, the Town of Eckville recorded a population of 1,125 living in 443 of its 465 total private dwellings, which represents no change from its 2011 population of 1,125.

Culture 
Eckville is home to several festivals and events throughout the year:
 Eckville Indoor Rodeo
 Bull-arena
 Eckville 50s & 60s Dance Jamboree
 Canada Day celebrations
 Eckville Winter Carnival
 Tree-lighting Ceremony

Education 
Eckville has two public schools, Eckville Junior/Senior High School and Eckville Elementary.  The town is relatively close to Sylvan Lake and many students from Eckville attend schools there.  Eckville is also a short drive from Red Deer College.

Eckville Junior/Senior High School attracted national attention in 1984 when history teacher and vice-principal James Keegstra was charged under the Criminal Code of Canada for teaching his students antisemitic material, including Holocaust denial. Keegstra was stripped of his teaching credentials and convicted. His appeals eventually reached the Supreme Court of Canada in 1990, where his conviction was upheld in R v Keegstra. Keegstra was mayor of Eckville at the time, but was defeated in a subsequent election.

Notable people 
Mellisa Hollingsworth, Olympic medalist in skeleton
James Keegstra, former mayor, convicted of hate speech in a landmark Canadian legal case

See also 
List of communities in Alberta
List of towns in Alberta

References

External links 

1921 establishments in Alberta
Towns in Alberta